Anton Dmitriyevich Bocharov (born 14 January 1995) is a Russian football player. He plays for FC Amkar Perm.

Club career
He made his professional debut in the Russian Professional Football League for FC Syzran-2003 on 18 July 2014 in a game against FC Rubin-2 Kazan.

He made his Russian Football National League debut for FC Olimpiyets Nizhny Novgorod on 10 March 2018 in a game against FC Sibir Novosibirsk.

References

External links
 

1995 births
Sportspeople from Samara, Russia
Living people
Russian footballers
Association football midfielders
FC Lada-Tolyatti players
PFC Krylia Sovetov Samara players
FC Nizhny Novgorod (2015) players
FC Zenit-Izhevsk players
FC KAMAZ Naberezhnye Chelny players
FC Tyumen players
FC Nosta Novotroitsk players
FC Amkar Perm players
Russian First League players
Russian Second League players